Wide Open Spaces may refer to:

Wide Open Spaces (album), a 1998 album by the Dixie Chicks
"Wide Open Spaces" (song), a song from the Dixie Chicks album
Wide Open Spaces (1924 film), starring Stan Laurel
Wide Open Spaces (1947 film), starring Donald Duck
Wide Open Spaces, an outdoors website published by Publishers Clearing House

See also
"Wide Open Space", a 1996 song by UK band Mansun
Wide Open Space (festival) in the Australian Northern Territory